Monika Simančíková (born 14 August 1995) is a Slovak former competitive figure skater. She is the 2012 Ondrej Nepela Memorial silver medalist and 2012 Slovak national champion. She qualified to the free skate at five ISU Championships, including the 2013 World Championships in London, Ontario, Canada.

She trained mainly in Nové Mesto nad Váhom and occasionally in Piešťany and Oberstdorf. Her mother is a figure skating coach of younger children.

Programs

Competitive highlights 
JGP: Junior Grand Prix

References

External links 

 
 Monika Simančíková at Tracings

1995 births
Slovak female single skaters
Living people
Sportspeople from Piešťany